The 2018–19 Western Athletic Conference men's basketball season began with practices in September 2018 and ended with the 2019 WAC men's basketball tournament March 2019 at the Orleans Arena in Las Vegas, NV. The season marks 56th season of Western Athletic Conference.

Pre-season
The WAC conducted a media teleconference on October 10, 2018 and released the media and coaches poll, as well as the preseason All-WAC teams and player of the year.

WAC Media Poll

Media All-WAC Team
First Team
Damiyne Durham, CSU Bakersfield
AJ Harris, NM State
Matej Kavas, Seattle U
Alessandro Lever, Grand Canyon
Conner Toolson, Utah Valley

Second Team
Xavier Bishop, Kansas City
Eli Chuha, NM State
Oscar Frayer, Grand Canyon
Jake Toolson, Utah Valley
Terry Winn III, UT Rio Grande Valley

Player of the Year
 Alessandro Lever, Grand Canyon

WAC coaches poll

Coaches All-WAC Team
First Team
 Oscar Frayer, Grand Canyon
 AJ Harris, NM State
 Matej Kavas, Seattle U
 Alessandro Lever, Grand Canyon
 Conner Toolson, Utah Valley

Second Team
 Xavier Bishop, Kansas City
 Eli Chuha, NM State
 Damiyne Durham, CSU Bakersfield
 Jake Toolson, Utah Valley
 Terry Winn III, UT Rio Grande Valley

Player of the Year
 Alessandro Lever, Grand Canyon

Rankings

Regular season

Conference games

Conference matrix
This table summarizes the head-to-head results between teams in conference play. (x) indicates games remaining this season.

Point scored

Head coaches

Post season

Conference tournament

NCAA tournament

NIT

2019 NBA Draft

Pre-draft trades

Draft-day trades

Highlights and notes

Awards and honors

Players of the Week

All-Americans

All WAC teams

All-Academic

USBWA All-District team

References